Okaw may refer to:
 Okawville, Illinois, a village, formerly known as Okaw, United States
 The Kaskaskia River, formerly known as the Okaw River, Illinois, United States
 The West Okaw River, Illinois, United States